Mount Angel Abbey is a Roman Catholic monastery of Benedictine monks in the northwest United States, located in St. Benedict, Oregon. Northeast of Salem, it was established  in 1882 from Engelberg Abbey, Switzerland. As of 2021, the abbey is home to approximately 51 monks.

History

1882–1903: Establishment
Mount Angel Abbey was founded on October 30, 1882, by Benedictine monks who immigrated to the United States from Engelberg, Switzerland, who found the abbey's landscape to be similar to that which they had left in the Swiss Alps. It was conceived by Father Adelhelm Odermatt, a monk of Engelberg Abbey who was working in Missouri.

Five years after the abbey's foundation, the monks opened their school in 1887 under the name of Mount Angel College. In 1889, at the request of Archbishop William Gross of Oregon City, the monks established a seminary in conjunction with their college.

1904–Present: Expansion
In 1904, the community was officially declared an abbey, which meant that it became independent from its motherhouse in Switzerland. Father Thomas Meienhofer, also a native of Switzerland, was elected the first abbot. In 1926, a second fire in the abbey's history destroyed its monastery, forcing the community into private homes and the nearby parish school and rectory. The monks began rebuilding, and in 1930 erected Aquinas Hall, and a gymnasium in 1936. In 1939, the Abbey's first daughterhouse, Westminster Abbey, was established in Vancouver, British Columbia. In 1946, the college was shut down so that the Abbey could focus on its seminary and boys' preparatory school. In 1959, a retreat house was constructed on the property to serve the spiritual needs of laypeople. In the early 1950s, the monastery became one of approximately 900 locations that would serve as emergency hospitals in the event of a nuclear war.

In 1965, two new monasteries were started from Mount Angel Abbey: Ascension Priory in Idaho, and Our Lady of the Angels Priory in Cuernavaca, Mexico. In 1980, Father Bonaventure Zerr was elected as the seventh abbot, establishing a new library for not only seminarians, but for the use of scholarly research. The library at the abbey was designed by Finnish architect Alvar Aalto. Though the seminary has historically been the central focus of the abbey, it has also become open to non-seminarians seeking degrees in philosophy and theology. In the 1970s, the Abbey community had a total of 125 monks living on the grounds, making it one of the largest Benedictine male communities in the United States.

Abbots
The abbey's abbots since 1904 are as follows.
1904-1910 Thomas Aquinas Meienhofer
1910-1921 Placidus Fuerst
1921-1934 Bernard Murphy
1934-1950 Thomas Aquinas Meier 
1950-1974 Damian Jentges
1974-1980 Anselm Galvin
1980-1988 Bonaventure Zerr
1988-1997 Peter Eberle
1997-2001 Joseph Wood
2001-2009 Nathan Zodrow
2009-2016 Gregory Duerr
2016-present Jeremy Driscoll

Seminary and School of Theology
Mount Angel Seminary, which was originally part of the now closed Mount Angel College, serves numerous western dioceses and has approximately 170 students. The college was originally composed of seven schools, but as the college turned its focus toward the seminary, the two remaining schools are the liberal arts college and the Graduate School of Theology. The Seminary's main church has a tower that contains the largest free-swinging bells on the west coast. In 2006, a new seminary building received a Best Sustainable Award for Oregon and Washington. The following year, to commemorate the abbey's 125th anniversary, a new bell tower was erected.

The seminary has undergraduate and graduate programs. The undergraduate program is devoted towards a bachelor's degree in philosophy. The four-year liberal arts curriculum, leading to a Bachelor of Arts degree, may be completed with a major in Philosophy, a double major in Philosophy and Literature, or a double major in Philosophy and Religious Studies. The seminary offers degrees to both lay students and those studying for the priesthood. The Graduate School of Theology offers MDiv, MA (Theology), STB, and DMin degree programs.

Library
The Mount Angel Library was designed by Finnish architect Alvar Aalto, built in 1970, and renovated in 1980. The library is used by both seminary students and theology students and contains 240,000 physical volumes and 100,000 electronic volumes (30% religion, 10% philosophy, and 60% history, art, music, and more), offering the largest theology collection in the Northwest United States. In addition to a wide range of books, the library also has an archive of medieval manuscripts dating back to the 12th century. The library has digitized multiple manuscripts, many from England, France, and Italy, through the Ethiopic Manuscripts Digitization Project.

Museum
The Mount Angel Abbey Museum is a collection of assorted artifacts, including mounted animal dioramas, rocks and minerals, serendipitous objects, antique liturgical vestments, religious items, and Civil War memorabilia. The museum is also known for containing certain distinctive 'Americana' items: the largest pig hairball in the world, as well as housing a collection of deformed cows.

Benedictine Brewery 
In 2018, the third monastic brewery in the United States opened at the Abbey. Brewing is common among Trappists, but is also part of the Benedictine tradition—which is the order that occupies the Mount Angel Abbey, a  monastery secluded on a wooded butte above the small farming town of Mount Angel. Abbey monks are now brewing beer as part of a six-year project helmed by Father Martin and his understudy, Father Jacob, with guidance from beer writers Jeff Alworth and Stan Hieronymus.

See also
Engelberg Abbey, the parent abbey of Mount Angel
Westminster Abbey (British Columbia)

References

External links 

 

 
Order of Saint Benedict
1882 establishments in Oregon
Alvar Aalto buildings
Benedictine monasteries in the United States
Buildings and structures in Marion County, Oregon
Catholic universities and colleges in Oregon
Education in Marion County, Oregon
Modernist architecture in Oregon
Mt. Angel, Oregon
Museums in Marion County, Oregon
Natural history museums in Oregon
Religious museums in the United States
Benedictine colleges and universities
Catholic seminaries in the United States
Swiss-American history
Roman Catholic Archdiocese of Portland in Oregon
Universities and colleges accredited by the Northwest Commission on Colleges and Universities